George Harper (12 May 1877 – 14 July 1914) was an English footballer who played in the Football League for Wolverhampton Wanderers, Grimsby Town and Sunderland.

Career
Harper played for several amateur clubs before joining Aston Villa of the Football League. However, he failed to make a first team appearance for the club and left to join Hereford Thistle.

He was signed in August 1897 by First Division side Wolverhampton Wanderers. He made his club debut on 4 December 1897 when he scored in a 2–0 victory over Derby County, before again scoring in his second appearance a week later.

The forward made only occasional appearances during his first two seasons at Molineux but became a first team regular during the 1899–1900 season, in which he finished as the club's leading goalscorer. He scored eight goals as a regular player during the next campaign but was sold at its conclusion to Grimsby Town.

He spent the 1901–02 season with Grimsby before moving to Sunderland where he finished his league career.

References
 

1877 births
1914 deaths
Footballers from Birmingham, West Midlands
Association football inside forwards
English footballers
Burton Wanderers F.C. players
Aston Villa F.C. players
Hereford Thistle F.C. players
Wolverhampton Wanderers F.C. players
Grimsby Town F.C. players
Sunderland A.F.C. players
English Football League players